Marius Bercea (born 1979) is a Romanian contemporary artist born and raised in Cluj, Romania, where he still resides.

Life and work
Bercea was a BA student at the University of Art and Design in Cluj-Napoca, where he studied under Professor Ioan Sbarciu, graduating in 2003. He received his MA from the Art and Design University of Cluj-Napoca in 2005, and has also taught at that institution for the past five years.
He is a founding member of Laika, an artists' collective that coordinates studio and exhibition space within Cluj's Fabrica de Pensule (Paintbrush Factory), and in Bucharest. Other artists associated with Laika include Serban Savu, Mircea Suciu and Vlad Olariu.

Philosophy
At the age of 10, Bercea experienced the Romanian Revolution of 1989 and later the collapse of the USSR. His paintings can be seen as an amalgamation of memory, recollection and reality, communicating to the viewer a personalised vision of post-communist, early-capitalist Romania. Using what he describes as "an intensely personal archive" – family photographs, newspaper clippings, and tales from his family's history – his paintings replicate the tonal impression of a Polaroid and fabricate the sense of a fading past, sometimes focussing on the happiness of simple moments and childhood routines.

Golden ochre-tinged yellow tones pervades much of his work, a colour that derives from an image of Chernobyl nuclear plant the painter has kept since childhood. The New York Times compared Bereca's use of colour to that of Luc Tuymans paintings. Yet where Tuymans adopts muted overtones, Bercea's use of colour is bolder and applied with force. Deep blue or sulfur-yellow skies sing when set against rich green rolling hills and the flecked grey of his concrete structures. Bercea's disparate use of colour corresponds to the 'swirling tangle of buckling roads, trees and buildings on the brink of collapse' in Bercea's 2011 Truths with Multiple Masks, which generates 'an unnerving sense of detritus and decay'.

Bogdan Iacob said of Bercea's paintings:

Bercea's show Remains of Tomorrow was curated by Jane Neal, who wrote of the paradox of familiarity in Bercea's works: 
Bercea's new series of paintings recently exhibited at François Ghebaly in Los Angeles represent a ‘sulfurous yet tenaciously poignant world’ by creating a mixed documentation of memories of his native Romania. His experiences are woven together, integrating figures and fauna amid architectural features. According to the LA Times (May 7, 2016):

Selected solo exhibitions
2016 '(On) Relatively Calm Disputes', François Ghebaly Gallery, Los Angeles, US   
2014 'Hypernova', Blain|Southern, London, UK.   
2012 'Concrete Gardens', François Ghebaly Gallery, Los Angeles, US. 
2011 'Remains of Tomorrow', Blain|Southern, London, UK. 
2010 'Qui Vivra Verra', François Ghebaly Gallery, Los Angeles, US.
2009 'Time will Tell', Chungking Project, Los Angeles, US.
2009 'If Through the Copper Woods You Pass', Eleven Fine Art Gallery, London, UK.
2008 'Shorn lambs fall behind', Mie Lefever Gallery, Ghent, Belgium.
2008 'Yellow Side of Glamour/Melted Guidelines are passé', Contemporary Gallery of Brukenthal Museum, Sibiu, Romania.

Selected group exhibitions
2015 ‘Appearance and Essence’, Timișoara Art Encounters, Timișoara, Romania. 
2015 ‘Young Collectors 2’, Elgiz Museum of Contemporary Art, Istanbul, Turkey.
2015 ‘Love: The First of the 7 Virtues’, Hudson Valley Centre for Contemporary Art (HVCCA), Peekskill, US.
2014 ‘Deface’, Boulder Museum of Contemporary Art (BMoCA), Colorado, US.
2014 ‘The Romanian-Bulgarian Union. A Retrospective’, Part of Salonul de proiecte Curatorial Program at National Museum of Contemporary Art Bucharest, Salonul de proiecte, Bucharest, RO.
2014 ‘The Art School of Cluj’, Województwo Małopolskie, Kraków, Poland. 
2013 'Hotspot Cluj – New Romanian Art', ARKEN Museum of Modern Art, Denmark.
2012 'Nightfall', Moden Centre for Modern and Contemporary Arts, Debrecen, Hungary.
2012 'Referencing History', Green Gallery, Dubai, United Arab Emirates. 
2012 'European Travellers', Mucsarnok Kunsthalle, Budapest, Hungary. 
2012 Art Los Angeles Contemporary, Los Angeles.
2011 'Selektionseffekte', Blain|Southern Berlin, Germany.
2011 'Palets', Barbara Thumm Gallery, Berlin, Germany.
2011 'After the Fall', Hudson Valley Centre for Contemporary Art, Peekskill, New York.
2010 'No New Thing Under the Sun', Royal Academy, London.
2010 'Mircea Pinte Collection', Museum of Art, Cluj-Napoca, Romania.
2009 'Close to Home', Galleria Davide Di Maggio, Milan, Italy.
2009 'Invisible Body, Conspicuous Mind', The Luckman Fine Arts Complex, Los Angeles.
2009 'Prague Biennale 4', Prague.
2008 'Under Natural Circumstances', MODEM, Museum of Contemporary Art, Debrecen, Hungary.
2008 '15 Hungarian and Romanian Painters', Plan B Gallery, Cluj-Napoca.
2007 'PLUS 2', Museum Kuppersmuhle fur Moderne Kunst, Duisburg, Germany.
2004 'Air-Bag', National Art Museum, Cluj-Napoca.

Notes and references

External links
Romanian Contemporary Art and the School of Cluj

1979 births
Living people
Contemporary painters
Artists from Cluj-Napoca